John Edward Arthur Woodnutt (3 March 1924 – 2 January 2006) was an English character actor, often cast in villainous roles.

Early life and education
The younger son of Harold Frederick Woodnutt and brother of the Conservative MP Mark Woodnutt, he was born in London, and at the age of 18 made his acting debut at the Oxford Playhouse.

Career
He had many television roles, including that of Henry VII in the first episode of The Six Wives of Henry VIII (1970); Sir Watkyn Bassett in the television series Jeeves and Wooster (1990 to 1993); and Merlin and Mogdred in the children's adventure game programme Knightmare (1987–1990). One of his earliest television roles was in 1956 in the ITV drama One, broadcast live. He appeared five times in Z-Cars and once in Softly, Softly.

He appeared four times in the BBC science fiction television series Doctor Who:
  Spearhead from Space (1970) as Hibbert
  Frontier in Space (1973) as the Draconian Emperor
  Terror of the Zygons (1975) in the dual roles of Broton and the Duke of Forgill
  The Keeper of Traken (1981) as Seron

He appeared in The Avengers episode "Quick-Quick Slow Death" in 1966 and played "The Spidron" in the cult science fiction series The Tomorrow People in 1973. He also appeared in the Look and Read educational serial "The Boy From Space" in 1971, as the Thin Spaceman; the BBC children's drama adaptation of The Secret Garden (1975); the 1976 HTV series Children of the Stones as the sinister butler Link; and the 1978 series The Doombolt Chase. In the 1980s, he played various roles in several television movies such as Hitler's SS: Portrait in Evil, starring Bill Nighy and John Shea. In the BBC Scotland television series of The Secret Garden, made in 1975, he played the part of Mr. Archibald Craven. He appeared in producer Barry Letts's classic serials Sense and Sensibility, Stalky & Co., and The Pickwick Papers. He played the Senior Tutor in Porterhouse Blue and also appeared briefly in the comedy sketch show Paul Merton: The Series in the early 1990s. He also appeared in an episode of The Bill, series 7, Episode 11 as Mr Cork.

Radio and television Sherlock Holmes stories in which he appeared included the BBC Radio 4 adaptation of The Hound of the Baskervilles and, as the fussy banker Mr. Merryweather, in the series The Adventures of Sherlock Holmes with Jeremy Brett in the episode entitled The Red-Headed League. He also made an appearance in the 1965 Douglas Wilmer Sherlock Holmes series on the BBC.

His film credits included roles in The Scarlet Blade (1963), Man in the Middle (1964), All Neat in Black Stockings (1968), Connecting Rooms (1970), Who Dares Wins (1982), Champions (1984), Lifeforce (1985), Mack the Knife (1989) and Bullseye! (1990).

Personal life
He was married twice and had two sons and three daughters. The last part of his life was spent at Denville Hall, an actors' retirement home in Northwood.

Filmography

References

External links

1924 births
2006 deaths
English male stage actors
English male film actors
English male television actors
Male actors from London